Judd Trump has made eight maximum breaks and more than 900 century breaks in the professional sport of snooker.

Maximum breaks
Trump has made eight official maximum breaks in professional competition.

Century breaks
Trump joined the professional circuit at the start of the 2005–06 snooker season. He won his first professional match and made his first century on 7 November 2005, in the first qualifying round of the 2006 Malta Cup. The match was against Alfie Burden and was played at Pontins in Prestatyn, Wales, several weeks before the main event. He made his first two centuries at the main stages of a ranking event on 11 February 2008, in his last-48 defeat of Joe Swail at the Welsh Open. His 100th career century was recorded in the final of the 2011 China Open against Mark Selby, and his 300th in a last-64 match against Fraser Patrick at the 2014 UK Championship. Trump's 400th century was against Ronnie O'Sullivan in the final of the 2016 European Masters; he compiled three centuries in the match, the third of these being his 400th.

He made his 500th career century in the 2018 Championship League, while playing against Liang Wenbo on the first day of the Group 4 matches, and he made his 600th on the second day of the Winners' Group of the 2019 Championship League, in his match against Martin Gould. Trump's 700th century was recorded within a year of his 600th, on the first day of the Winners' Group of the 2019–20 Championship League, in his round-robin match against Anthony McGill. He became the fifth player to reach that milestone, after Stephen Hendry, Ronnie O'Sullivan, John Higgins and Neil Robertson. He made his 750th century at the 2020 UK Championship, in his match against Dominic Dale, becoming the fourth player to make 750 career centuries. Later in the tournament, Neil Robertson also completed his 750th century.

Trump compiled his 775th century on 8 February 2021, in his Championship League match against Jack Lisowski, to equal Stephen Hendry's career total. He made his 776th century the next day, in his group match against Mark Selby, taking third place on the all-time centuries list, behind Ronnie O'Sullivan and John Higgins. Trump was 31 when he passed the 775 century mark, compared with O'Sullivan who was 39 when he passed Hendry's total at the 2015 Masters, and Higgins who was 44 when did the same at the 2019 Scottish Open. He made his 800th century on 1 April 2021, during the winners' group of the 2021 Championship League, in his match against John Higgins. He made his 900th century on 17 March 2023 in his first round match at the WST Classic against David Lilley.

Trump made 102 centuries in the 2019–20 snooker season, becoming only the second player to reach 100 in a season. His final total was one less than the record of 103, set by Neil Robertson in the 2013–14 season.

Milestones

Full list
The following table lists Trump's centuries made in professional competition. Only the events where he made at least one century are included in the list. The centuries are not necessarily presented in full chronological order because some of the leagues were played over an extended period and some qualifying stages were played a considerable time before the main event. The tournaments are categorised as Ranking (R), Minor-ranking (MR), or Non-ranking (NR). Centuries made in qualifying matches are noted; these were made at a different venue to the main event.

References

Trump, Judd